Fantastic Frank Strozier is the debut album by American saxophonist Frank Strozier, recorded in 1959 and 1960 for Vee-Jay Records.  The personnel includes the rhythm section from part of Miles Davis's Kind of Blue, recorded earlier in 1959.

Reception 
Scott Yanow of AllMusic describes the music of Fantastic Frank Strozier as "advanced hard bop" that "is both enjoyable and (due to Little's presence) somewhat historic"; (trumpeter Booker Little died in 1961 after a short but brilliant career, making this album one of Little's few recordings). Critics Richard Cook and Brian Morton of The Penguin Guide to Jazz gave the album a favorable review, noting that "we have long held this record in high esteem and it never fails to deliver."

Track listing 
All compositions by Frank Strozier except as indicated
"W. K. Blues" (Wynton Kelly) – 4:07
"A Starling's Theme" – 5:27
"I Don't Know" – 8:19
"Waltz of the Demons" (Booker Little) – 5:42
"Runnin'" – 4:20
"Off Shore" (Leo Diamond, Michael Goldsen) – 6:51

Bonus tracks on VeeJay 2014 CD reissue:
"Lucka Duce" – 9:57
"Run" – 3:39
"Tibbit" – 9:51
"Just in Time" (Jule Styne, Betty Comden, Adolph Green) – 7:30
"Off Shore" (Alternate Take 3) (Leo Diamond, Michael Goldsen) – 6:32

Bonus tracks on Koch Jazz 2000 CD reissue:
"Lucka Duce" – 9:57
"Tibbit" – 9:51
"Just in Time" (Jule Styne, Betty Comden, Adolph Green) – 7:30
"Waltz of the Demons" (Alternate Take) (Booker Little) – 6:30
"Off Shore" (Alternate Take 3) (Leo Diamond, Michael Goldsen) – 6:32

Personnel 
 Frank Strozier – alto sax
 Booker Little – trumpet
 Wynton Kelly – piano
 Paul Chambers – bass
 Jimmy Cobb – drums

References 

Frank Strozier albums
1960 albums
Vee-Jay Records albums
Hard bop albums